The 2004 Jacksonville Jaguars season was the tenth season in franchise history, Jack Del Rio’s second year as the head coach of the Jacksonville Jaguars and Byron Leftwich’s first full year as starting quarterback. In a time of transition for the franchise, Del Rio’s coaching and Leftwich’s play helped to pull the Jaguars out of a four season slump to a finish of 9–7, placing second in the AFC South. However, they missed the playoffs for the fifth successive season.

Offseason

Draft

Staff

Roster

Schedule
In addition to their regular games with AFC South rivals, the Jaguars played teams from the AFC West and NFC North as per the schedule rotation, and also played intraconference games against the Steelers and the Bills based on divisional positions from 2003.

Note: Intra-division opponents are in bold text.

Game summaries

Week 1

Standings

References

Pro Football Reference

Jacksonville Jaguars
Jacksonville Jaguars seasons
Jackson